Cymindis angustior is a species of ground beetle in the subfamily Harpalinae. It was described by Kraatz in 1884.

References

angustior
Beetles described in 1884